Iloai Suaniu (born 26 September 1978) is a Samoan athlete. She competed in the women's javelin throw at the 1996 Summer Olympics. She was the first woman to represent Samoa at the Olympics.

References

External links
 

1978 births
Living people
Athletes (track and field) at the 1996 Summer Olympics
Samoan female javelin throwers
Olympic athletes of Samoa
Place of birth missing (living people)